George Ward Barron (1883–1961) was an English professional footballer who played as an outside right. Born in Darlington, he made one appearance in the Football League First Division for Sheffield Wednesday in 1903.

References

1883 births
1961 deaths
Footballers from Darlington
English footballers
Association football outside forwards
Sheffield Wednesday F.C. players
English Football League players